Alagna Valsesia (Walser German: Im Land, Piedmontese: Alagna, Valsesiano: Lagna) is a comune and small village high in the Valsesia alpine valley in the province of Vercelli, Piedmont, northern Italy, a UNESCO World heritage site since 2013. It is a tourist place for mountaineering and winter sports, and it is internationally renowned for the freeride off-piste skiing. It was originally settled by Walser at the beginning of the 12th century. It is located at an elevation of  just south of the Monte Rosa, elevation  (the second tallest peak in the Alps); It is very close to Milan and to the international Milan–Malpensa Airport.

Since December 2005 a  cable car connects Alagna with Gressoney (AO) through the Passo dei Salati.

History
Founded in the 13th century by a German population ("Walser") descending from the north into the Italian valleys around Monte Rosa, it has preserved today its atmosphere with several buildings built around 1500–1600 in a pure "Walser Style", still in perfect condition, built using local wood and stones (called 'Piode'). This spontaneous architecture has been totally preserved: the wooden cage around the building was in fact invented for putting the hay to dry out.

Main sights
The Church of Saint John the Baptist was built in 1511 and it has preserved many sculptures by Giovanni d'Enrico a famous Italian artist (1559–1644).

At the entrance of the town, there is the native house of Tanzio da Varallo (1575–1633), brother of Giovanni d'Enrico and one of the most famous Italian artists. His works are in the most prestigious art gallery in the world.

Mountaineering

Alagna is one of the Alpine towns which have played a crucial role in the history of mountaineering. The Guides Association was founded in 1872 and it is the oldest in Italy second only to that of Courmayeur (1868). From the town started all the first expeditions on the close Monte Rosa; the first one was on 23 July 1801 when Pietro Giordani, a native of Alagna, reached the summit of the peak which now is called by his name (Giordani peak). In 1819 Zumstein reached the third-highest Monte Rosa peak (Zumstein peak). Finally between August the 8th and the 9th, the Alagna parish priest, reached, after three attempts, the fourth tallest peak of Monte Rosa and the highest in the Alagna Valley, the today called Gnifetti Peak.

The mountaineering tradition is still alive: Silvio Mondinelli, the second Italian climber to reach all the 14  peaks of the world, has done several climbs on the Alagna side of Monte Rosa. In September 2011, Hervè Barmasse and his father opened a new route on the south-east face of the Gnifetti peak , which is at the moment the most difficult route on this side of the massif and one of the most challenging in the entire group (VI, ED).
Finally, Alagna is the starting point for reaching the Margherita hut, the highest hut in Europe, on the Gnifetti Peak top.

Freeride world capital

Alagna is internationally known for being the freeride capital of the Alps. The reason for this great quantity of routes is in the particular morphological shape of the main valley, steep but at the same time with several lateral smaller valleys "Comb shape" which permit huge exploitation of the territory. Plus, thanks to the difference in height from the top of the ridges (Monte Rosa is ) to the bottom of the valley (Alagna itself is only at ), most routes cover a huge slope. The landscape is wild, severe and very impressive. The majority of the itineraries are around the Punta Giordani  and the wild area of the Malfatta . Rides include that of Balma, which crosses the entire Bors Valley from Indren to Pastore Hut , and the alternatives routes starting from Passo dei Salati: Canale a Y, Canale Rettilineo, Canale Obliquo, Canale Longhez, all around the 45°. There are other itineraries in the Otro Valley (Passo Zube S3+, Passo della Coppa S3+, Canale Jschechette S4+), close to Corno Bianco. By Eliski itineraries include Il Cavallo (starting point around ), Rizzetti and Il Turlo. Extreme rides are Perazzi Couloir along Punta Parrot (55°) and Sesia Couloir (60° and 65° close to the ridge) between Punta Gnifetti and Punta Parrot.

Skiing in Alagna Valsesia: the Monterosa ski resort

Alagna Valsesia is part of the huge Monterosa Ski area, a ski-resort at the feet of Monte Rosa which connects three different valleys in Piedmont and in Aosta Valley, with 180 km of runs. Since 2017, a new chair lift, brings from Cimalegna at an elevation of  just above the Passo dei Salati permitting direct access to the freerides routes in the Vallone delle Pisse.

References

External links
 Alagna Valsesia
 Freeride Paradise
 Saluti da Alagna
 Official tourism information
 Photos of Alagna